Open water swimming competitions at the 2022 South American Games in Asuncion, Paraguay were held on October 11, 2022 in Encarnación's Playa San José

Medal summary

Medal table

Medalists

Participation
Twelve nations participated in open water swimming events of the 2022 South American Games.

References

Open water
South American Games
2022
2022 South American Games